Acatrinei is a Romanian surname. Notable people with the surname include:
 Andreea Acatrinei (born 1992), Romanian artistic gymnast
 Dorel-Gheorghe Acatrinei (born 1977), Romanian politician

Romanian-language surnames
Matronymic surnames